Pedro Ortíz was a Mexican middle-distance runner. He competed in the men's 1500 metres at the 1932 Summer Olympics.

References

Year of birth missing
Year of death missing
Athletes (track and field) at the 1932 Summer Olympics
Mexican male middle-distance runners
Olympic athletes of Mexico
Place of birth missing
20th-century Mexican people